PDEA may refer to:
Public Domain Enhancement Act, a bill in the United States Congress.
Philippine Drug Enforcement Agency, law enforcement agency of the Philippines tasked with combating the trade of illegal drugs in the country.